There are several rusts (Pucciniales syn. Uredinales) which affect rye (Secale cereale) including:

 Puccinia spp.:
 Stem rust (Puccinia graminis)
 Leaf rust (Puccinia triticina)
 Crown rust (Puccinia coronata)

See also 
 List of rye diseases

Rye diseases
Fungal plant pathogens and diseases